The Belgian Sport Horse, is a Belgian breed of warmblood sport horse. It is one of three Belgian warmblood breeds or stud-books, the others being the Belgian Warmblood and the Zangersheide. It is bred for dressage, for show-jumping and for three-day eventing.

History 

The Belgian Sport Horse has its origins in the early twentieth century, when warmblood horses were bred by cross-breeding imported Selle Français and Thoroughbred stallions with local animals of the Belgian Draught breed, with the intention of producing cavalry horses. Later influences were from Selle Français, Dutch Warmblood and Hanoverian. A breed society, La Société d'Encouragement pour l'Elevage du Cheval d'Armes, was established in 1920; from about 1930 the principal aim was to breed horses for leisure use and the name Société du Cheval de Demi-sang Belge was adopted. In 1967 it became a royal society, with the name Société Royale du Cheval de Demi-sang Belge.

References 

Horse breeds originating in Belgium
Warmbloods